The 2003 Nebelhorn Trophy took place between 3 and 6 September 2003 at the Bundesleistungszentrum Oberstdorf. It is an international senior-level figure skating competition organized by the Deutsche Eislauf-Union and held annually in Oberstdorf, Germany. The competition is named after the Nebelhorn, a nearby mountain. This was the first international competition to use the ISU Judging System.

It was one of the first international senior competitions of the season. Skaters were entered by their respective national federations, rather than receiving individual invitations as in the Grand Prix of Figure Skating, and competed in four disciplines: men's singles, ladies' singles, pair skating, and ice dance. The Fritz-Geiger-Memorial Trophy was presented to Canada, the country with the highest placements across all disciplines.

Results

Men

Ladies

Pairs

Ice dance

External links
 2003 Nebelhorn Trophy

Nebelhorn Trophy
Nebelhorn Trophy, 2003
2003 in German sport